Monywa University,,  is a co-ed higher education institution located in Monywa, Sagaing Region, Myanmar. The university is officially recognized by the Department of Higher Education of the Ministry of Education. Courses and programs that lead to officially recognized higher education degrees in several areas of study are offered to local and foreign students. The university provides academic and non-academic facilities as well as services to students such as a library and administrative services.

In 2014, students from Monywa University launched a campaign protesting the National Education Bill. They feared that the bill would give too much power to the Ministry of Education.

References

Universities and colleges in Monywa
Universities and colleges in Sagaing Region
Business schools in Myanmar
Universities and colleges in Myanmar